Natchez High School is a public school in Natchez, Mississippi (USA). It is part of the Natchez-Adams School District and serves students in grades nine through twelve.

About 
In 2005, it had 1358 students and 73 teachers. 88% of the students were African-American and the remainder were white.

 the school district is considering building a new campus for the high school and converting the former campus into a middle school.

Demographics
There were a total of 1169 students enrolled in Natchez High during the 2006–2007 school year. The gender makeup of the school was 52% female and 48% male. The racial makeup of the school was 90.4% black, 9.3% white, and 0.3% Hispanic.

History 
The former location of Natchez High School was at 64 Homochitto Street, it also known as Margaret Martin High School, and it was a public high school "for white students-only". It was built in 1927, a few years after the Brumfield School, a public school for African American students.

Notable alumni
 Allen Brown, former NFL player
 Paige Cothren, former NFL player
 Terry W. Gee, member of the Louisiana House of Representatives from 1980 to 1992
 Justin Hamilton, NFL player
 Charlie Kempinska, former NFL player
 Bob Dearing, member of the Mississippi Senate
 Perry Lee Dunn, former NFL player
 Lynda Lee Mead, Miss America 1960
 Mike Morgan, former NFL player
 Rico Richardson, former NFL player
 James Williams, former NFL player

References

External links
 
 publicschoolreview.com

Schools in Adams County, Mississippi
Public high schools in Mississippi
Buildings and structures in Natchez, Mississippi